Leyen Spiegel is a two-volume book of sermons, with parallel texts in Estonian and German. It was written by Heinrich Stahl and published in Tallinn in 1641 and 1649. It is one of the oldest complete Estonian language books to survive. An original copy is held in the National Library of Estonia.

References

Estonian literature
1641 books
1649 books
17th century in Estonia
History of Tallinn